Mosel may mean the following:

People and businesses
 Mosel (surname), notable people with this surname
 Mosel Vitelic Corporation, subsidiary of Mosel Vitelic Inc. focused on memory integrated circuits
 Mosel Vitelic Inc., a semiconductor company listed on the Taiwan Stock Exchange

Computing
 Mosel (programming language), mathematical programming language for optimization software

Places
 Moselle, a European river, named Mosel in German
 Mosel (wine region), a German appellation, formerly known as Mosel-Saar-Ruwer
 Mosel, Wisconsin, U.S.A., a town
 Mosel (community), Wisconsin, an unincorporated community
Mosel (Zwickau), a community in Southeastern Germany

Ships 
 V-1605 Mosel, a German trawler in World War II
 Mosel (A512), a modern German replenishment ship

See also
 Moselle (disambiguation)
 Mosul, a city in Iraq